Gabriele Rubini (born 29 June 1983 in Frascati, Italy), known professionally as Chef Rubio, is a former semi-professional Italian rugby player and television presenter for DMAX.

Sporting career
Born in Frascati, he is the brother of professional rugby player Giulio Rubini. Gabriele played  rugby from an early age, after making his debut in 2002 for Rugby Roma Olimpic against Parma; he became an athlete of national status, so that the  Italian Rugby Federation delayed his transfer to the following season.  Between 2003 and 2005 he played for Rome, making a total of 12 appearances in Series A games.

At the end of the season he moved to New Zealand, and was recruited by Poneke Rugby Club near Wellington. To earn his living, he began working in a restaurant,  and thus developed an interest in culinary arts alongside his passion for rugby.

Returning to Italy in 2007 he played for Rovigo in the Super 10 league, and from 2008, first in Series A, then in Excellence with Lazio until a ligament injury ended his sporting career in 2011.

Meanwhile, he had trained as a chef with an international course from which had graduated in 2010.

He's been a television presenter until 2019, when he abandoned DMAX for personal reasons.

TV Programs
Unti e bisunti: DMAX
Unti e bisunti 2: DMAX
Il ricco e il povero: NOVE and DMAX
È uno sporco lavoro: DMAX
Camionisti in trattoria: DMAX
Camionisti in trattoria 2: DMAX

References

External links
Web site
Dmax

Profile

1983 births
Living people
People from Frascati
Italian television presenters
Italian rugby union players
Sportspeople from the Metropolitan City of Rome Capital
Rugby Roma Olimpic players
Rugby union flankers
Rugby Rovigo Delta players
S.S. Lazio Rugby 1927 players
Italian chefs
Italian expatriate rugby union players
Expatriate rugby union players in New Zealand
Italian expatriate sportspeople in New Zealand